In Greek mythology, Peirous or Peiroos (Ancient Greek: Πείροος) was a Thracian war leader from the city of Aenus and an ally of King Priam during the Trojan War.  Peirous was the son of Imbrasus and father of Rhygmus (who fought at Troy alongside his father). Peirous was killed by Thoas, leader of the Aetolians.

Namesake 
 2893 Peiroos, Jovian asteroid named after Peirous

See also 
 List of Trojan War characters

Notes

References 
 Homer, The Iliad with an English Translation by A.T. Murray, Ph.D. in two volumes. Cambridge, MA., Harvard University Press; London, William Heinemann, Ltd. 1924. . Online version at the Perseus Digital Library.
 Homer, Homeri Opera in five volumes. Oxford, Oxford University Press. 1920. . Greek text available at the Perseus Digital Library.

People of the Trojan War